Los Chulos Son Pa' Cuidarlos is the first album recorded by Spanish singer Alejandro Sanz, known at the time as Alejandro Magno, with the label Hispavox. The record, which fused flamenco and techno, was met with critical and commercial indifference, and today Sanz views the record to be "insignificant". However, the album is now considered to be a collector's item. In an attempt to promote Los Chulos Son Pa' Cuidarlos, he performed at strip clubs, playing short sets between acts. This proved to be unsuccessful and Sanz took a break from music, choosing to study business administration.

Track listing 
 Los Chulos Son Pa' Cuidarlos  – 2:50 (J.Torres, Sagrario, Deloina)
 Tomasa  – 2:54 (A.L. Arenas)
 El Apartamento  – 3:32 (J.Torres, Sagrario, Deloina)
 Se Busca un Lío  – 2:25 (A.L. Arenas)
 Doña Marina  – 3:35 (J. Torres, J. Alejandro, L. Tamora, J.L. Oliveros)
 Tom Sawyer  – 3:00 (Alejandro Sánchez)
 Señor Papa  – 3:29 (A.L. Arenas)
 Cuando Navegamos  – 3:24 (A.L. Arenas)
 Micaela  – 2:50 (A.L. Arenas)
 Ajaulili  – 3:17 (A.L. Arenas)

References 

1989 debut albums
Alejandro Sanz albums